The 1997 WNBA season was the inaugural season for the Utah Starzz. The Starzz were partially named after the old ABA team, the Utah Stars, but with the zz at the end like the Utah Jazz. The franchise held the distinction of having the worst record in the WNBA in 1997.

Offseason

Initial Player Allocation

WNBA Draft

Regular season

Season standings

Season schedule

Player stats

|-
| 
| 28 || 28 || 33.4 || .374 || .250 || .676 || 8.0 || 1.7 || 1.7 || 0.2 || 15.8
|-
| 
| 28 || 27 || 32.6 || .390 || .377 || .694 || 7.4 || 2.2 || 1.5 || 2.3 || 12.2
|-
| 
| 28 || 10 || 21.7 || .384 || .265 || .774 || 2.9 || 2.1 || 1.4 || 0.3 || 8.1
|-
| 
| 28 || 26 || 29.7 || .312 || .297 || .764 || 2.8 || 3.1 || 0.8 || 0.1 || 7.7
|-
| 
| 27 || 4 || 17.4 || .390 || .313 || .844 || 2.3 || 1.7 || 0.5 || 0.3 || 5.7
|-
| 
| 28 || 24 || 24.7 || .347 || .100 || .655 || 3.0 || 2.4 || 0.8 || 0.1 || 5.5
|-
| 
| 19 || 7 || 15.1 || .390 || .222 || .714 || 2.8 || 0.4 || 0.7 || 0.1 || 4.0
|-
| 
| 13 || 10 || 20.6 || .517 || .667 || .750 || 2.8 || 0.8 || 0.7 || 0.3 || 3.4
|-
| 
| 26 || 0 || 10.1 || .463 || .000 || .563 || 1.4 || 0.4 || 0.5 || 0.4 || 3.2
|-
| 
| 26 || 4 || 12.3 ||.333 || .000 || .568 || 3.1 || 0.9 || 0.9 || 0.6 || 2.3
|-
| 
| 8 || 0 || 5.4 || .385 || — || 1.000 || 0.9 || 0.1 || 0.1 || 0.4 || 1.5
|-
| 
| 4 || 0 || 4.8 || .000 || .000 || — || 0.3 || 0.5 || 1.0 || 0.3 || 0.0
|}
‡ Waived during the season

Elena Baranova ranked third in the WNBA in total rebounds with 207
Dena Head ranked fifth in the WNBA in Free Throw Pct with .844
Wendy Palmer ranked second in the WNBA in total rebounds with 225.
Wendy Palmer ranked sixth in the WNBA in field goals with 157. 
Wendy Palmer ranked fourth in the WNBA in points with 443 points.
Wendy Palmer ranked ninth in the WNBA in minutes per game with 33.4
Wendy Palmer ranked fourth in the WNBA in points per game with 15.8
Tammi Reiss ranked tenth in the WNBA in assists with 87.

Awards and honors
Elena Baranova: Led WNBA, Blocks, 63
Elena Baranova: Led WNBA, Blocks per game, 2.2
Elena Baranova, Ranked second in the WNBA (tied), Defensive Rebounds, 151
Wanda Guyton: Ranked second in WNBA (tied), Offensive Rebounds, 76
Wendy Palmer: Led WNBA, Field Goal Attempts, 420
Wendy Palmer: Ranked second in the WNBA, Free Throws, 117

References

External links
Starzz on Basketball Reference

Utah Starzz seasons
Utah
Utah Starzz